Ironomyiidae is a small family of flies in the order Diptera. Historically, they had been included in the family Platypezidae, and includes three extant species within the single extant genus Ironomyia endemic to Australia and a number of extinct fossil genera from North America and Asia extending back to the Early Cretaceous.

Genera
Ironomyia White, 1916
Ironomyia francisi McAlpine, 2008
Ironomyia nigromaculata White, 1916
Ironomyia whitei McAlpine, 2008
†Cretonomyia McAlpine 1973 Canadian amber, Campanian
†Proironia Grimaldi 2018 Burmese amber, Myanmar, Cenomanian
†Eridomyia Mostovski 1995 Ola Formation, Russia, Campanian
†Hermaeomyia Mostovski 1995 Dzun-Bain Formation, Mongolia, Aptian Zaza Formation, Russia, Aptian, Ola Formation, Russia, Campanian
†Palaeopetia Zhang 1987 Laiyang Formation, China, Aptian, Dzun-Bain Formation, Mongolia, Aptian Zaza Formation, Russia, Aptian, Ola Formation, Russia, Campanian
†Macalpinomyia Li and Yeates 2018 Burmese amber, Myanmar, Cenomanian

References

External links 

Brachycera families
Platypezoidea
Diptera of Australasia